Soul Proprietor is an EP by British singer-songwriter Alessi Laurent-Marke. It is her first on new record label Bella Union and marks her move from major label Virgin to an independent. It coincides with her most high-profile tour as special guest to acclaimed British folk artist Laura Marling at her UK shows in April 2010. Prior to its release music website Drowned in Sound offered a free download of one song from the EP, "Shovelling", as a preview. Photographer Rebecca Miller took the cover shot at the How We Lived Then museum in Eastbourne.

Track listing
All songs written by Alessi Laurent-Marke
 "The Robot"
 "Shovelling"
 "Dancing Feet"
 "The Bird Song"

References

2010 EPs
Alessi's Ark albums